Ana Emilia Lahitte (La Plata, December 19, 1921 – July 10, 2013) was an Argentine writer. Her works include several literature genres, but mainly poetry.

Works
 1993 "El tiempo, ese desierto demasiado extendido".
 1995 "Cinco Poetas capitales: Ballina, Castillo, Mux, Oteriño y Preler".
 1997 "Summa (1947-1997)".
 2003 "Insurrecciones".
 "Los abismos".
 "El cuerpo".
 "Cielos y otros tiempos".
 "Sueños sin eco".
 "Los dioses oscuros.
 "Roberto Themis Speroni"

Awards
 1980 International PEN Silver feather.
 1982 Golden Puma of Argentine Poetry Foundation.
 1983 National Poetry First Prize
 1994 Prize Konex, merit diploma.
 1997 Literature Prize "Homero Manzi".
 1999 Poetry Literature Prize "Esteban Echeverría".
 2002 "Great Honour Award" and "Golden Puma" of Argentine Poetry Foundation.
 2005 "Sol del Macla Award", MACLA.

See also
 Lists of writers

References

External links
 Sololiteratura.com
 Fundación Konex

1921 births
2013 deaths
Argentine women poets
People from La Plata
20th-century poets
20th-century women writers
Burials at La Plata Cemetery
Argentine poets